The girls' 4 × 100 metre medley relay event at the 2010 Youth Olympic Games took place on 16 August 2010 at the Singapore Sports School.

Medalists

Heats

Heat 1

Heat 2

Final

References

 Heat Results
 Final Result

Swimming at the 2010 Summer Youth Olympics